Lorenzo Morón Vizcaíno (born 16 February 1970), known as Loren, is a Spanish retired footballer who played as a central defender, currently a manager.

He amassed Segunda División totals of 279 games and 11 goals, representing five clubs. He appeared in 99 La Liga matches over four seasons (five goals), with Mérida, Salamanca and Recreativo.

Playing career
Born in Marbella, Andalusia, Loren kickstarted his 18-year senior career with CA Marbella, helping the club promote from Tercera División to Segunda División in only two seasons. He made his debut in the latter competition on 6 September 1992, in a 1–1 home draw against CD Castellón.

In the summer of 1993, Loren signed with second-tier side CP Mérida, helping them promote to La Liga for the first time ever in his second year. In the following campaign, he started in all his 22 league appearances in an eventual relegation as second from bottom.

Loren split the following nine years between the top flight and division two, in representation of UD Salamanca, Sevilla FC and Recreativo de Huelva. He scored a career-best three goals – at the professional level – with the second team in 2000–01, adding his second championship in the second tier in the process. Two seasons later, his two goals from 32 appearances could not help prevent Recreativo from being relegated from the top tier, and he also started in the final of the Copa del Rey, a 0–3 loss to RCD Mallorca in Elche.

Loren retired in 2007 at the age of 37, after two years in Segunda División B with his first club, now renamed UD Marbella.

Coaching career
Loren started working as a head coach in late 2014, with amateurs Atlético Mancha Real. On 23 March 2015, he replaced Pablo Alfaro at the helm of Marbella as the team was placed inside the relegation zone, eventually leading them to a comfortable tenth-place finish in the third division.

After leaving Marbella by mutual consent in April 2016, Loren took over at nearby Tercera División club Vélez CF in October. In December 2017, over two decades after playing in the Extremaduran capital, he was hired as manager of Mérida AD, replacing Mehdi Nafti who returned to the helm the following March when the situation had not improved.

On 1 August 2019, Loren was appointed coach of Mons Calpe S.C. in the Gibraltar National League. He left shortly after, returning to his country and signing with amateurs UD Los Barrios in the same capacity.

Personal life
Loren's son, also named Lorenzo, was also a footballer. A striker, he represented mainly Real Betis.

Managerial statistics

Honours
Marbella
Segunda División B: 1991–92

Mérida
Segunda División: 1994–95 

Sevilla
Segunda División: 2000–01

Recreativo
Copa del Rey runner-up: 2002–03

References

External links

1970 births
Living people
People from Marbella
Sportspeople from the Province of Málaga
Spanish footballers
Footballers from Andalusia
Association football defenders
La Liga players
Segunda División players
Segunda División B players
Tercera División players
CA Marbella footballers
CP Mérida footballers
UD Salamanca players
Sevilla FC players
Recreativo de Huelva players
Marbella FC players
Spanish football managers
Segunda División B managers
Tercera División managers
Marbella FC managers
Gibraltar National League managers
Mons Calpe S.C. managers
Spanish expatriate football managers
Expatriate football managers in Gibraltar
Spanish expatriate sportspeople in Gibraltar